AEAC may refer to:

 Adult Entertainment Association of Canada, a coalition of strip club owners and their agents
 Agnes Etherington Art Centre, a public art gallery